Brown clay or Brown Clay may refer to:

Brown clay
Another name of pelagic clay, is a type of pelagic sediment
James Brown Clay, American politician
Umber